Little White River can refer to:

 Little White River (Florida), drains into Escambia Bay
 Little White River (South Dakota), tributary of the White River
 Little White River (Indiana)
 Little White River (Ontario), tributary of the Mississagi River

See also
 Little White Salmon River, Washington, tributary of the Columbia River